Bill Moody was a detective chief superintendent in the Metropolitan Police in London during the early 1970s. He was the head of the Obscene Publications Squad. He was tried for corruption in 1977, convicted and sentenced to twelve years imprisonment.

References 

Metropolitan Police chief officers
Year of birth missing (living people)
Living people
Place of birth missing (living people)
British police officers convicted of crimes